The 2004 Japan rugby union tour of Europe was a series of test-matches played in November 2004 in Scotland, Romania and Wales Europe by Japan rugby union team.

Results

Scotland: 15.Hugo Southwell, 14.Chris Paterson, 13.Ben Hinshelwood, 12.Andrew Henderson, 11.Sean Lamont, 10.Dan Parks, 9.Chris Cusiter, 8.Jon Petrie, 7.Donnie Macfadyen, 6.Ally Hogg, 5.Nathan Hines, 4.Stuart Grimes, 3.Gavin Kerr, 2.Gordon Bulloch (capt.), 1.Allan Jacobsen,  – replacements: 16.Robbie Russell, 17.Craig Smith, 18.Scott Macleod, 19.Jason White, 20.Mike Blair, 21.Gordon Ross, 22.Graeme Morrison 
Japan: 15.Ryohei Miki, 14.Koichiro Kubota, 13.Seiichi Shimomura, 12.Yukio Motoki, 11.Hayato Daimon, 10.Keisuke Sawaki, 9.Wataru Ikeda, 8.Takuro Miuchi (capt.), 7.Hajime Kiso, 6.Naoya Okubo, 5.Hitoshi Ono, 4.Takanori Kumagae, 3.Ryo Yamamura, 2.Takashi Yamaoka, 1.Yuichi Hisadomi,  – replacements: 16.Mitsugu Yamamoto, 17.Masahito Yamamoto, 18.Feletikiki Mau, 19.Takatoyo Yamaguchi, 20.Kiyonori Tanaka, 21.Masatoshi Mukoyama, 22.Hideyuki Yoshida 

Romania: 15.Valentin Maftei, 14.Bogdan Voicu, 13.Cristian Sauan, 12.Romeo Gontineac, 11.Ion Teodorescu, 10.Ionut Tofan, 9.Vali Calafeteanu, 8.Alin Petrache (capt.), 7.Alex Tudori, 6.Costica Mersoiu , 5.Cristian Petre, 4.George Oprisor, 3.Marcel Socaciu, 2.Razvan Mavrodin, 1.Petru Balan,  – replacements: 16.Bogdan Zebega Suman, 17.Cezar Popescu, 18.Petrisor Toderasc, 19.Valentin Ursache, 20.Iulian Andrei, 21.Ionut Dimofte, 22.Dan Dumbrava 
Japan: 15.Ryohei Miki, 14.Koichiro Kubota, 13.Seiichi Shimomura, 12.Masatoshi Mukoyama, 11.Hiroki Mizuno, 10.Hideyuki Yoshida, 9.Kiyonori Tanaka, 8.Takuro Miuchi (capt.), 7.Takatoyo Yamaguchi, 6.Naoya Okubo, 5.Hajime Kiso, 4.Takanori Kumagae, 3.Ryo Yamamura, 2.Takashi Yamaoka, 1.Masahito Yamamoto,  – replacements: 17.Yuichi Hisadomi, 19.Feletikiki Mau, 20.Wataru Ikeda, 21.Yukio Motoki      –  No entry: 16.Mitsugu Yamamoto, 18.Hitoshi Ono, 22.Hayato Daimon

Wales: 15.Rhys Williams, 14.Hal Luscombe, 13.Tom Shanklin, 12.Gavin Henson, 11.Shane Williams, 10.Ceri Sweeney, 9.Gareth Cooper, 8.Michael Owen, 7.Colin Charvis (capt.), 6.Dafydd Jones, 5.Jonathan Thomas, 4.Ryan Jones, 3.Gethin Jenkins, 2.Mefin Davies, 1.Duncan Jones,  – replacements: 16.Steve Jones, 17.Adam Jones, 18.Alix Popham, 19.Martyn Williams, 21.Mike Phillips, 22.Kevin Morgan    –  No entry : 20.Matthew Watkins
Japan: 15.Ryohei Miki, 14.Koichiro Kubota, 13.Masatoshi Mukoyama, 12.Yukio Motoki, 11.Hayato Daimon, 10.Hideyuki Yoshida, 9.Wataru Ikeda, 8.Takuro Miuchi (capt.), 7.Feletikiki Mau, 6.Naoya Okubo, 5.Takanori Kumagae, 4.Hajime Kiso, 3.Ryo Yamamura, 2.Takashi Yamaoka, 1.Masahito Yamamoto,  – replacements: 16.Mitsugu Yamamoto, 17.Tatsukichi Nishiura, 19.Takatoyo Yamaguchi, 20.Kiyonori Tanaka, 22.Tatsuhiko Otao     –  No entry: 18.Koichi Kubo, 21.Sadanobu Imari

References
 
 

Japan
tour
Japan national rugby union team tours
tour
tour
tour
Rugby union tours of Scotland
Rugby union tours of Romania
Rugby union tours of Wales
2004–05 in Romanian rugby union
Japan